Triaziquone is a drug used in chemotherapy.

It is an alkylating agent. It can react with DNA to form intrastrand crosslinks.

References

Aziridines
Alkylating antineoplastic agents
1,4-Benzoquinones